Lorenzia is a genus of plants in the family Araceae, first described in 2012. It has only one known species, Lorenzia umbrosa, endemic to Amapá state in north-eastern Brazil.

References

Aroideae
Monotypic Araceae genera
Endemic flora of Brazil